Memron is a 2004 mockumentary film inspired by the Enron scandal. This improv film stars Mike McShane as the corrupt Memron executive, and also features Claire Forlani, Tim Bagley, John Lehr and Evie Peck. The film was written, directed and produced by Nancy Hower, and won several awards at various film festivals.

External links

2004 television films
2004 films
2004 comedy films
Enron
American comedy films
2000s English-language films
2000s American films